Richard Hansen may refer to:

Rick Hansen (born 1957), Canadian paraplegic athlete, activist and philanthropist
Richard D. Hansen, American archaeologist

See also
Rick Hansen (politician) (born 1963), Minnesota state representative
Richard Hanson (disambiguation)